Dietmar Göhring (born 15 July 1960) is a German swimmer. He competed in three events at the 1980 Summer Olympics for East Germany.

References

1960 births
Living people
German male swimmers
Olympic swimmers of East Germany
Swimmers at the 1980 Summer Olympics
Swimmers from Leipzig